Frontier Airpark is a private airport and suburban housing development located east of Marysville, Washington. The airpark was established in 1985 and features a single  runway that is connected to homes by a series of taxiways.

References

Transportation in Snohomish County, Washington
Airports in Snohomish County, Washington